Zoran Đurišić (born 29 April 1971) is a Serbian football coach and former player who played as a forward.

Club career
In 1996, Đurišić joined K League side Ulsan Hyundai Horangi.

References

External links
 

Yugoslav footballers
Serbian footballers
Association football midfielders
K League 1 players
Ulsan Hyundai FC players
Serbian expatriate sportspeople in South Korea
Expatriate footballers in South Korea